Taiyuan is the capital city of Shanxi, China.

Taiyuan may also refer to:

Locations in China
Taiyuan, Chongqing (太原), a town in Pengshui Miao and Tujia Autonomous County, Chongqing
 Taiyuan, Hengyang (台源镇), a town of Hengyang County, Hunan,
Taiyuan Township (太源乡), a township in Nanfeng County, Jiangxi

Historical eras
Taiyuan (251–252), era name used by Sun Quan, emperor of Eastern Wu
Taiyuan (376–396), era name used by Emperor Xiaowu of Jin

See also
 
Northern Thai people, also known as Tai Yuan
Thái Nguyên, the capital city of Thái Nguyên Province in northern Vietnam
Thái Nguyên Province